Abdikadir Yusuf Aar aka Sheikh Qalbi, was an Islamic terrorist and senior Al-Shabaab officer from the Juba region.

He had been a member of Al-Itihaad Al-Islamiya (AIAI) in Luq from 1995 to 2002. In Al-Shabab he served as leader in both Juba and Gedo regions.

During the "anti-insurgency offensive" launched by TFG and AMISOM to drive Al-Shabab out of Mogadishu he was killed in action (KIA) near to the former Defense Ministry in Mogadishu on March 16, 2011.

References

20th-century births
2011 deaths
Somalian Islamists
Al-Shabaab (militant group) members